The Patriot Ledger is a daily newspaper in Quincy, Massachusetts, that serves the South Shore. It publishes Monday through Saturday.

Known for its thorough news coverage of the 26 communities south of Boston, The Patriot Ledger has won numerous international, national and regional newspaper and public service awards over the years. It has been named New England Newspaper of the Year 16 times, most recently in 2016, 2017 and 2018.

History 

(All material here provided by The Patriot Ledger, primarily from its archives.)

The paper was founded on Jan. 7, 1837, as the weekly Quincy Patriot by John Adams Green and Edmund Butler Osborne.

The Quincy Patriot was the hometown paper of President John Quincy Adams, a frequent writer of letters to the editor after he left the White House and became a congressman.

The longest-running family ownership began in 1852 when George Washington Prescott went to work for the paper as a carrier. He later bought the newspaper.

Prescott was a descendant of Col. William Prescott, who won fame at the Revolutionary War battle of Bunker Hill with his order: "Don't fire until you see the whites of their eyes."

In 1890, Prescott started The Quincy Daily Ledger, continuing The Patriot as a weekly. In 1916, the weekly and daily were merged into The Quincy Patriot Ledger. The paper later expanded to serve communities throughout the South Shore.

In the 1950s, the paper became a pioneer in newspaper production. Early experimentation led to development of the first practical photo-typesetting machine. Newspaper executives from throughout the world visited the paper to learn about the new process.

The Patriot Ledger was also among the first papers in the nation to establish zoned editions for local news and advertising, exchanging journalists with foreign countries, transmitting news copy and page layouts by facsimile, using a front-end computer editing system, installing a two-way radio system for spot news coverage, pioneering the use of 35-millimeter photography and setting up a "little merchants" carrier system.

In 1979, G.W. Prescott Publishing Co. bought the Memorial Press Group and the Old Colony Memorial of Plymouth, Mass.

The Patriot Ledger moved from its longtime editorial and business office location in downtown Quincy to the Crown Colony Office Park in South Quincy in 1988, then moved to 2 Adams Place on the Quincy-Braintree line.

The newspaper was sold in 1997 to Newspaper Media LLC, which also owned The Enterprise in Brockton. It was bought by GateHouse Media in 2006. 

In September 2013, an affiliate of the principal shareholder of GateHouse Media, Fortress Investment Group, purchased the Dow Jones Local Media Group. Among the eight daily and 25 weekly publications included in the sale were the Cape Cod Times, the Standard Times of New Bedford and the Portsmouth (N.H.) Herald. GateHouse manages all of those publications.

In November 2013, GateHouse emerged from prepackaged Chapter 11 bankruptcy proceedings, less than two months after filing  to restructure $1.2 billion of debt that was scheduled to come due in August 2014. The company is now owned by New Media Investment Group Inc.

In November 2019, GateHouse merged with the Gannett newspaper chain, publisher of USA Today and 100 other newspapers. Now operating under the Gannett name, the company owns more than 500 newspapers across 39 states, one of every six in the country. GateHouse CEO Mike Reed continued in that position with the combined companies.

Mark Oliveiri is the publisher of The Patriot Ledger and its sister publication, The Enterprise of Brockton, Mass., and Lisa Strattan is the executive editor.

References

External links
The Patriot Ledger web page

Mass media in Norfolk County, Massachusetts
Newspapers published in Massachusetts
Newspapers established in 1837
Quincy, Massachusetts
Gannett publications
1837 establishments in Massachusetts